Franciscus Max "Franc" Weerwind (born 22 September 1964) is a Dutch politician of Democrats 66 (D66) who has been serving as minister for legal protection in the cabinet of Prime Minister Mark Rutte since 10 January 2022.

Early life and education
Weerwind was born in Amsterdam and is of Surinamese descent. He grew up in Nieuw-Vennep and studied Public administration at the Leiden University between 1986 and 1992 (he did not complete his study). During his attending years at the university, and at the same time as the then crown prince Willem-Alexander of the Netherlands, he became a member of the student fraternity LSV Minerva in 1987.

Political career
In 2000, Weerwind became deputy city manager of Leiderdorp and a year later he became city manager of Wormerland. On 1 december 2004, he was appointed mayor of the municipality of Niedorp, and from September 2009 until September 2015 he was mayor of Velsen. From September 2015 until January 2022 he was mayor of Almere.

Under Weerwind’s leadership, the Dutch government resumed adoptions of children from the Philippines, Hungary, Lesotho, Taiwan, Thailand and South Africa in 2022, after a nearly two-year-freeze on new international adoptions.

References

External links
 Franc Weerwind, Government.nl

1964 births
Living people
20th-century Dutch civil servants
21st-century Dutch civil servants
21st-century Dutch politicians
Democrats 66 politicians
Dutch people of Surinamese descent
Leiden University alumni
Mayors in North Holland
Mayors of Almere
Ministers without portfolio of the Netherlands
People from Niedorp
People from Velsen
Politicians from Amsterdam